Oopik Pitsuilak is an Inuk carver and sculptor who works in the Cape Dorset community of Inuit artists in Canada.

Early life 
She was born in Lake Harbour, Northwest Territories, now Kimmirut, Nunavut, in 1946. Pitsuilak was raised in Lake Harbour and Cape Dorset, where some of her relatives worked for the Hudson's Bay Company trading posts in the area.

Artwork 
Pitsuilak works in soapstone, often using female figures as subjects. She also works in beadwork, and incorporates beading into her sculptures. Pitsuilak's works are part of collections in the Canadian Museum of History, the Montreal Museum of Fine Arts, and the Winnipeg Art Gallery.

References 

Artists from Nunavut
Inuit artists
Inuit sculptors
1946 births
Living people
Inuit from the Northwest Territories
Inuit from Nunavut
People from Kimmirut
People from Kinngait